Scottish war memorials are found in all communities in Scotland. They are found on most main streets and most churches in Scotland. Many commemorate the sacrifice of the First World War but there are many others to wars before and since 1914–1918.

History of Scottish war memorials
The history of Scotland has often been bloody and there is a martial tradition which is strong in Scotland. Scots have fought in many battles and served in armed forces in many parts of the world. This service has been part of Scots armies; as mercenaries, and in the British Armed Forces. The service of the martial Scots are commemorated with war memorials across Scotland and around the world.

Scottish war memorials commemorate the sacrifices made as early as 1263 up to the recent war in Iraq and the conflict in Afghanistan

The earliest memorials record the battles fought against Viking and English invaders. Later ones recall Scottish civil wars. Sometimes these civil wars are related to religious intolerance, sometimes over the succession of royalty.

Most of these early memorials have the same thing in common. They were not erected until the 19th century, sometimes hundreds of years after the actual battle had taken place. Another thing they have in common is that they do not list individual names.

By the late 19th century after several small Colonial wars the infantry and cavalry regiments of Scotland had started to erect memorials in churches and garrison towns in Scotland. These memorials would now include lists of names. Sometimes just Officers, but sometimes non-commissioned officers and enlisted men

The first recorded civic war memorial in Scotland where local men who died overseas in war and were named on a stone is in the local churchyard at Balmaclellan, Dumfries and Galloway and was erected after the Crimean War. It was not until fifty years later after the Second Boer War that other civic war memorials were erected in Scotland.

By 1914 a precedent had been set for local communities for erecting war memorials when they had lost their sons in war time. By the time the First World War had finished in 1918 nearly every community in Scotland decided to erect a memorial to their own war dead.

At the same time a proposal for a national war memorial led to the creation of the magnificent shrine at Edinburgh Castle. The Scottish National War Memorial. This memorial continues to commemorate Scots who have died in wars since 1914 and currently commemorates 206,779 men and women who have died serving in UK and Commonwealth Forces.

At the same time as the civic and national memorials were being erected factories, banks, golf clubs, boys clubs, schools, universities churches, railways, police, post offices and even a prison erected war memorials to those men and women who had gone to war.

Because of the size of military formations during the First World War there were not only regimental memorials erected but Scottish Brigade and Scottish Divisional memorials too.

After the Second World War many communities had the sad task of adding names to their existing war memorial. Aberlady, East Lothian used the same memorial they had erected for the Boer War and used again for the First World War to list their Second World War Dead. Other communities chose to erect new memorials for the Second World War Dead rather than change the First World War Memorial.

Even today communities are still erecting war memorials to men and women who died in the First and Second World Wars.

Recent unveilings of Scottish war memorials include.
 The civic war memorials at Waterloo, Lanarkshire and Cowie, Stirling.
 The Air Forces Memorial at Grangemouth
 The Black Watch memorial at Balhousie Castle, Perth
 "Buckhaven’s Secret", Fife
 'Bamse' Memorial to the Norwegian Navy dog at Montrose
 WW1 Nurses' Memorial at Central Library, Edinburgh, unveiled on 11 November 2015

Types of Scottish war memorials
There is no typical Scottish war memorial. Five of the most common types are
Celtic cross, obelisk, cairn, mercat cross, and statue but they can also take the form of plaques or tablets of bronze, brass, marble, granite or wood; memorial gardens; fountains; rolls of honour; Crosses of Sacrifice;clock towers; lychgates; parks; halls; hospitals; bandstands; stained glass windows; altars; baptismal fonts; sporting cups and medals.

Scottish artists and architects including Sir Robert Lorimer, Alexander Carrick, Charles Pilkington Jackson, Thomas John Clapperton and William Birnie Rhind and others created some memorable monuments across the county.

After the First World War there was a difference of opinion in some communities as to whether a memorial to a community's sacrifice should be a practical memorial which would benefit the living or a stone memorial to the dead. This led to some memorials being District Nurses, hospital beds, holiday cottages for war widows and orphans. Reorganisations of health care since the formation of the National Health Service has meant that the care of these memorials was taken out of local control and many of these memorials no longer exist. With the disappearance of the memorial the sacrifice is forgotten.

Care of memorials

Once the memorials were erected and unveiled the committee who raised them then passed them into the care of another organisation. In the case of the civic memorials they were passed on to the local Municipal Corporation or County Council who still maintain them to this day (as Unitary Authorities) through the local community council. Often the local branch of the Royal British Legion Scotland or other local volunteers help with the maintenance and upkeep of the civic memorials. The Royal British Legion Scotland also run an annual campaign called the "Best Kept War Memorial".

Non-civic memorials are often in the care of churches, or clubs or private companies. When these organisations leave a building, refurbish it or close then the future of the war memorials in their care is not always assured.

Since the 1960s church mergers and closures have sometimes meant that memorials integral to the buildings have been lost when the building has been demolished. Sometimes a new memorial is created to replace the old one such as at St George's Church in Edinburgh. Sometimes photographs of the memorials are all that is left. Greenside Church in Edinburgh have photographs of the memorial windows of St James's which were demolished along with the building in 1975.
The roll of honour from St Mungo's Church is in private hands after it was left for salvage when the Lockhart Memorial Church in Edinburgh dissolved in 1984.
Other private memorials are at risk too. A roll of honour in Livingston was recovered from a rubbish skip after the Social Club it was in was refurbished in 2008 and the memorial was thrown away.

Interest in Scottish war memorials
There are three organisations with a national interest in Scottish war memorials.
UK National Inventory of War Memorials is based in the Imperial War Museum in London and is recording basic information of all the UK's war memorials. Also known as the UKNIWM
War Memorials Trust has been set up to help local organisations with information on maintenance, conservation, listing and cleaning of war memorials. In Scotland it works with Historic Scotland in running a small grants scheme for conservation and repair of war memorials including restoring the legibility of inscriptions. (note that routine maintenance is specifically excluded)
The Scottish War Memorials Project has been set up to record Scotland's war memorials (see below)

The Scottish War Memorials Project
Running since December 2006 as a voluntary project to photograph and record all of Scotland's war memorials and make them online for free. The Scottish War Memorials Project has over 4,900 war memorials recorded to date including nearly all the c.1,400 civic memorials in the cities, towns and villages across Scotland.

Using photograph hosting websites the project is internet forum based. It has no running costs and is entirely voluntary.

Examples of Scottish war memorials
Based on the UKNIWM's approximate total of 100,000 war memorials in the whole of the UK then an assumption of a total of Scottish war memorials of up to 10,000 is not an unreasonable estimate. It would be impossible to list them all here so the following lists are based on examples already listed on Wikipedia and Wikimedia Commons.

Pre-First World War
Battle of Drumclog Memorial
Battle of Culloden Memorial
Balmaclellan Crimean War Memorial

First World War
There are over 1,000 civic war memorials remembering the First World War in Scotland. There are hundreds more non-civic memorials so this list provides only a small example of the war memorials in Scotland

Alloa War Memorial
Beith War Memorial
Blairgowrie War Memorial
Cameronians (Scottish Rifles) Memorial
Crimond War Memorial
City of Dundee War Memorial
Kilmarnock War Memorial
Kilwinning War Memorial
Parish of Kildonan War Memorial
Isle of Lewis War Memorial
Maxwelltown War Memorial
Oban War Memorial
Scots American War Memorial
Stewarton war Memorial
War memorial near Brabsterdoran
Scottish National War Memorial, Edinburgh Castle. 148,270 names listed for 1914–1918

Spanish Civil War
Edinburgh Spanish Civil War Memorial

Second World War
 Scottish National War Memorial, Edinburgh Castle. 57,726 names listed for 1939–1945
 Royal Scots Fusilier World War II Memorial
 Commando Memorial, Spean Bridge
 5th Bn Seaforth Highlanders War Memorial
 XII Submarine Flotilla War Memorial

Post-Second World War to present
 Scottish National War Memorial, Edinburgh Castle. 783 names listed for wars since 1945

Scottish war memorials outside Scotland
War memorials to Scots and Scottish regiments can also be found outside Scotland

 51st (Highland) Division Monument (Beaumont-Hamel)
 The Liverpool Scottish memorial stone

Commonwealth War Graves Commission Memorials Commemorating Scots
Apart from the memorials listed above which are for Scots and Scottish regiments the following memorials are examples of Commonwealth War Graves Commission memorials which list Scots war dead on their panels.

 Menin Gate – commemorating the defenders that died in the Ypres Salient, whose graves are unknown, in Ypres, Belgium.
 Malta Memorial – dedicated to Commonwealth aircrew who fought, and lost their lives in the Mediterranean during the Second World War. Located in Valletta.
 Tower Hill Memorial – commemorating Merchant Seamen. Located in London
 Chatham Naval Memorial – One of the three main Royal Navy memorials erected after the First World War.
 La Ferté-sous-Jouarre memorial – Located in France

See also

 Armed Forces Memorial
 Canadian war memorials
 Military history of Scotland
 Scottish National War Memorial

References

External links

 Scottish War Memorials Project – Online record of Scottish war memorials
 United Kingdom Inventory of War Memorials – Online record of UK war memorials
 The War Memorials Trust
 The Scottish National War Memorial – Online database of Post-1914 Scottish war dead
 Scottish War Graves Project – Online record of Scottish war graves

 
War monuments and memorials